Michael Stebbins is an American geneticist and former Vice President of Science and Technology at the Laura and John Arnold Foundation. He previously served as Assistant Director for Biotechnology, at the White House Office of Science and Technology Policy.

Education
He received his B.S. in biology from the State University of New York at Stony Brook, and his Ph.D. in genetics while working at Cold Spring Harbor Laboratory, where he constructed genetic systems to artificially control gene expression in the brain.

Career
Stebbins is a member of the National Academies of Science, Board on Research Data and Information. He serves on the Board of Directors for the Value in Cancer Care Consortium that aims to improve access, affordability, and value of cancer therapies and Vivli, whose mission is to "Promote, coordinate, and facilitate clinical research data sharing through the creation and implementation of a sustainable global data-sharing enterprise."

He is the former President of the SEA Action Fund, a partner organization to Scientists and Engineers for America and co-founded and 'served on the Board of Scientists and Engineers for America (SEA), an organization that focused on promoting sound science in government. He is the former Director of Biology Policy for the Federation of American Scientists (FAS), where he worked on control of biological weapons, preparedness for biological, nuclear, and chemical weapons attacks, and the responsible use of science and technology.

On November 18, 2008, Stebbins was named a member of the Obama transition in the "Executive Office of the President Team," with responsibility for the Office of Science Technology and Policy."

At the White House, Stebbins was responsible for developing and driving initiatives in life sciences research, including the Administration’s efforts focused on improving veterans’ mental health, combating antibiotic resistance, increasing access to federally funded scientific research results, restoring pollinator health, and reforming the regulatory system for biotechnology products.

In April 2020, Stebbins co-wrote the proposal for the creation of a new federal agency modeled on DARPA, but focused on health. That proposal was adopted by the President Biden's campaign and became the model used to establish the Advanced Research Projects Agency for Health (ARPA-H).

Previously, Stebbins worked as a legislative fellow for U. S. Senator Harry Reid (D-NV) and as a policy fellow for the National Human Genome Research Institute.  He has also worked as a senior editor for the journal Nature Genetics, and as a science journalist for Reuters.  He has written for Seed Magazine, and is a science advisor to ScienCentral, a company that produces science-related news stories for ABC and NBC television affiliates.

Publications
Stebbins is the author of the book Sex, Drugs and DNA: Science's Taboos Confronted'  and was also a frequent contributor to This Week in Science, where he discussed issues relating to science and policy in his segment titled, The Weird from Washington.''

References

External links
"Wanted on the Hill: A Few Good Scientists", U.S. News & World Report, December 6, 2007
"OSTP Leadership & Staff"
"Laura and John Arnold Foundation"
"National Academies of Science, Board on Research Data and Information"
"Value in Cancer Care Consortium"
"Vivli"

1971 births
Living people
American geneticists
American science writers
Stony Brook University alumni